This is a list of members of the Western Australian Legislative Assembly between the 1904 elections and the 1905 elections, together known as the Fifth Parliament.

Notes
 Following the 1904 state election a new Ministry consisting of six members, including one Member of the Legislative Council, was appointed. These members were therefore required to resign and contest ministerial by-elections on 19 August 1904, at which all were returned unopposed.
 Sir Walter James, the Ministerialist member for East Perth and former Premier, resigned on 4 October 1904 to take up the position of Agent-General for Western Australia in London. At the resulting by-election on 20 October 1904, Ministerial candidate John Hardwick won the seat.
 Following a cabinet reshuffle on 7 June 1905, the Member for Brown Hill, Thomas Bath, was appointed Minister for Education and Lands, and the Member for Mount Leonora, Patrick Lynch, was appointed Minister for Works. Both were therefore required to resign and contest ministerial by-elections. Bath was returned unopposed on 22 June 1905. Lynch won the by-election in his seat against a second candidate on 30 June 1905.
 Following the failure of the Daglish Ministry in a want of confidence motion on 25 August 1905, a new five-member Ministry comprising Ministerialist members led by Cornthwaite Rason was formed. These members were therefore required to resign and contest ministerial by-elections. John Sydney Hicks, the member for Roebourne, was returned unopposed, while the other four ministers, who were contested, won the by-elections on 14 September 1905. A new election, held on 27 October, was then called to secure parliamentary support for the Ministry.
 Prior to the 1904 election, Labor had been a minor party and government had resided with the supporters of premiers and opposition leaders of various political dispositions, who usually held a formal minority of seats in the Legislative Assembly and relied on the support of Independents or the Labor Party. After Labor won minority government at the 1904 election, most of the other factions united into a single grouping, and several of the Independents elected in 1904 became associated with it, and ran as Ministerial candidates in the 1905 election.

Sources
 
 
 Western Australian Government Gazettes for 1904 and 1905; Indexed under "Electoral".

Members of Western Australian parliaments by term